Cooks Hill United FC is a semi-professional football club based in Cooks Hill in the Hunter Region, New South Wales. Cooks Hill United FC currently competes in the Northern NSW Football National Premier Leagues Northern NSW competition.

History
Cooks Hill United FC was competes Northern NSW Football National Premier Leagues Northern NSW competition after being promoted from the Northern League 1 Division in 2021. The National Premier Leagues Northern NSW is the first tier of football in NNSW.

David Tanchevski was appointed head coach for Cooks Hill United for 2021.

The club competed in the Northern League 1 Division from 2015–2021.

Former Newcastle Breakers and Socceroos striker Warren Spink was appointed head coach for Cooks Hill United in their inaugural year in NewFM for 2015.

Former Adamstown Rosebud FC Coach Graham Law was appointed head coach for Cooks Hill United for 2017.
Graham led Cooks Hill United FC to 3 consecutive Northern League Division 1 Premierships from 2017 to 2019. On the back of this success, the club applied for admission to the National Premier Leagues Northern NSW.  After this application was unsuccessful Graham Law resigned in order to pursue management opportunities at NPL level.

Former Newcastle Breakers & Hamilton Olympic NPL player Doug West has been appointed head coach for Cooks Hill United for 2020.

Committee
 Jeff Evans - President
 Warwick Sommer - Vice President
 Di Spurway - Secretary
 Sean Fitzgerald - Treasurer

First team squad

References

External links
 

Soccer clubs in Newcastle, New South Wales